Emma Jennifer McKeon,  (born 24 May 1994) is an Australian competitive swimmer. She is a four-time world record holder, one current and three former, in the 4x100 metre freestyle relay. Her total career haul of 11 Olympic medals following the 2020 Olympic Games made her Australia's most decorated Olympian and included one gold medal from the 2016 Summer Olympics in Rio de Janeiro and four gold medals from the 2020 Summer Olympics in Tokyo. With four gold and three bronze medals she was the most decorated athlete across all sports at the 2020 Summer Olympics, and tied for the most medals won by a woman in a single Olympic Games. She has also won 17 medals, including four gold medals, at the World Aquatics Championships; and a record 20 medals, including 14 gold, at the Commonwealth Games.

In 2021, McKeon tied Ian Thorpe for the most number of Olympic gold medals won over the course of an Australian athlete's career with five total gold medals earned at her first two Olympic Games. She was also the highest scoring competitor, male or female, for the 2021 FINA Swimming World Cup where she earned a total of fourteen medals, including ten gold medals.

Early life and education
McKeon was born on 24 May 1994 in Wollongong, New South Wales, Australia. She is the sister of Kaitlin (National age swimmer and Paramedicine student), Olympian David McKeon, and the daughter of four-time Commonwealth gold medalist and two-time Olympian Ron McKeon, both of whom are also swimmers. Her mother, Susie, was also a swimmer who competed in the Commonwealth Games and her uncle, Rob Woodhouse, was a two-time Olympian. She completed her secondary education in 2012 from The Illawarra Grammar School and following graduation, at the age of 18, relocated to Brisbane to train under Vince Raleigh at the Chandler Aquatic Centre in 2014. In 2015, McKeon switched coaches again and began training under Michael Bohl, initially at Brisbane's St Peters Western Swimming Club before the pair relocated to Griffith University on the Gold Coast in 2017 where McKeon studied a bachelor's degree in public health and health promotion with a major in nutrition.

Swimming career
McKeon competed at the 2010 Summer Youth Olympics held in Singapore. She won a gold medal in the girls' 4 × 100 metre medley relay; silver medals in the 100 metre freestyle and the mixed 4 × 100 metre freestyle relay; and bronze medals in the 50 metre freestyle, 200 metre freestyle, and mixed 4 × 100 metre medley relay.

Olympic Games

2012 Olympic Trials
McKeon missed out on selection for the London 2012 Summer Olympics by placing 7th in the 100 metre freestyle, 9th in the 100 metre butterfly, 10th in the 200 metre freestyle, and 13th in the 50 metre freestyle. Following her performance at the 2012 Olympic Trials and not making the 2012 Australia Olympic Team, McKeon took a break from swimming competition that helped her rejuvenate her drive and love of the sport.

2016 Summer Olympics

In April 2016 McKeon was selected as part of the Australian team for the 2016 Summer Olympics held in Rio de Janeiro, Brazil. Her brother David was also selected meaning the pair were the first brother and sister to swim at an Olympic Games for Australia since John and Ilsa Konrads in 1960.  At the 2016 Summer Olympics she led off the 4 × 100 metre freestyle relay that won a gold medal in a world record time of 3:30.65. McKeon also went on to win a pair of silvers as a part of the 4 × 200 metre freestyle and 4 × 100 metre medley relays. She was one of five Australian individual medallists in swimming in Rio, having won a bronze medal in the 200 metre freestyle with a time of 1:54.92. In the 100 metre butterfly, she finished 6th. In total, McKeon went three-for-three in her relay events, medaling in every event as well as competing in the final of each event, and one-for-two in her individual events for the 2016 Summer Olympics, which were her first Olympic Games.

2020 Summer Olympics

At the 2020 Summer Olympics held in Tokyo, Japan, McKeon won four gold medals. She swam the third leg of the 4 × 100 metre freestyle relay for the Australian team in the final, which won the gold medal in a world record time of 3:29.69. On the second to last day of swimming, she also won the gold medal in the 100 metre freestyle with a time of 51.96 seconds (an Olympic record and the second fastest time in history). On the last day, she won the 50 metre freestyle gold medal with another Olympic record time, of 23.81 seconds, and swam the butterfly leg of the gold medal-winning and Olympic record-setting finals Australian relay team for the 4 × 100 metre medley relay.

McKeon also won three bronze medals: in the 100 metre butterfly (with a new Oceanian record and Australian record of 55.72), and as part of the finals relay in both the 4 × 200 metre freestyle relay and the mixed 4 × 100 metre medley relay events. In total, McKeon made the podium in every event she raced, going seven-for-seven and winning an Olympic medal in each event as well as setting one world record and seven Olympics records in the process. Combined across her first Olympic Games (2016) and her second Olympic Games (2020), this brought her total number of world records set at the Olympic Games to two, she set her first world record at an Olympic Games at her first Olympic Games in 2016, and her total number of Olympic records to eight.

McKeon won seven medals in Tokyo, the most by any female swimmer at a single Olympic Games, and equalled the most medals won by a female athlete in any sport at a single Olympic Games, tying Soviet gymnast Maria Gorokhovskaya. She was the first female competitor at an Olympic Games since 1964 to lead the medal count across all sports, with the next highest ranking competitor in swimming, in terms of total medal count at the end of the 2020 Summer Olympics, being Caeleb Dressel of the United States who won a total of five medals at the year's Olympic Games. Her total of five Olympic gold medals across the 2016 and 2020 Olympic Games tied the Australian record held by Ian Thorpe, while her 11 total medals across her first two, and consecutive, Olympic Games broke the record of nine total Olympic medals of fellow Australians Ian Thorpe and Leisel Jones over the course of their careers. McKeon became the fourth swimmer in history to win seven or more Olympic medals at a single Olympic Games only after Mark Spitz, Matt Biondi, and Michael Phelps all of the United States, which made her the first swimmer in history, male or female, not from the United States to achieve the feat.

World Championships

2013
In 2013, she won a silver medal in the 4 × 100 metre freestyle relay at the 15th FINA World Championships held in Barcelona, Spain. She also swam in the heats of the 4 × 100 metre medley relay and the 4 × 200 metre freestyle relay on the way to Australia winning silver medals in those events.

2015
In 2015, she competed at the 16th FINA World Championships held in Kazan, Russia. She won a gold medal in the 4 × 100 metre freestyle relay a bronze medal in the 4 × 100 metre medley relay, finished fourth in the 100 metre butterfly and placed seventh in the 200 metre freestyle.

2017
McKeon won four silver and two bronze medals at the 2017 World Swimming Championships. She competed in 100 m butterfly. In the heats she was third, with a time of 56.81. After that in the second semifinal, she finished second tying the Oceania record of 56.23. In the final she improved this time and finished second behind Sarah Sjöström with a record of Oceania time of 56.18. In 200 m freestyle she continued from the heats to the semifinals with the fourth fastest time at 1:56.61. Then in the semifinals she was second in her heat and second overall. In the final she proved her good form and she shared the silver medal with Katie Ledecky with a time of 1:55.15, remaining behind the one-time Olympic and dual World medalist in that discipline, Federica Pellegrini. Her third silver medal came from the 4×100 metre freestyle relay with Bronte Campbell, Brittany Elmslie and Shayna Jack, her team coming 0.29 seconds behind the USA. Her fourth silver medal resulted from the 4×100 m mixed medley with team mates Mitch Larkin, Daniel Cave and Bronte Campbell where they set a new Oceanian record with their time of 3:41.21.

2019

At the 2019 World Aquatics Championships at Gwangju in South Korea Emma McKeon won six medals. She won three gold medals for the 4×100 metre freestyle relay, 4×200 metre freestyle relay and 4×100 m mixed medley relay. In the 4x200 metre relay the Australians broke the world record setting a time of 7:41.50 with McKeon swimming the anchor leg.

McKeon also collected two silver medals for the 4×100 metre medley relay and the 4×100 m mixed freestyle relay. In the mixed 4×100 metre freestyle relay, she set a new Oceanian and Australian record of 3:19.97 in the final along with her relay teammates Kyle Chalmers, Clyde Lewis, and Bronte Campbell. In individual events she received a bronze medal for the 100 metre butterfly with a time of 56.61 and finished fourth in the 100 metre freestyle 0.29 seconds behind bronze medallist Sarah Sjöström of Sweden.

Commonwealth Games

2014

She was selected as part of the Australian squad for the 2014 Commonwealth Games, held in Glasgow, Scotland, where she won six medals, four golds and two bronze medals. On the first day of competition she won a gold medal in the 200 metre freestyle and then competed in the 4 × 100 metre freestyle relay with Bronte Campbell, Melanie Schlanger and Cate Campbell, who gold medalled and set a new world record time of 3:30.98. She won individual bronze medals in the 100 metre butterfly and then in the 100 metre freestyle, behind the Campbell sisters as Australia took all podium positions. McKeon won further gold medals in the 4 × 200 metre freestyle relay, where she set a Games record as part of  team that also included Alicia Coutts, Brittany Elmslie and Bronte Barratt, and the 4 × 100 metre medley relay with Emily Seebohm, Lorna Tonks and Cate Campbell. Her six medals equalled a Commonwealth Games record for swimmers previously set by Ian Thorpe and Susie O'Neill.

2018

McKeon won the most number of medals in swimming at the 2018 Commonwealth Games in Gold Coast, Queensland, with four gold and two bronze medals; equalling her previous record, set at the 2014 Commonwealth Games, and shared with Ian Thorpe and Susie O'Neill. As part of the 4x100 metre freestyle relay, McKeon split a 52.99 and helped set a new world record in the event in the final and won a gold medal for her efforts. In the final of the 4x100 metre medley relay, she helped win the gold medal and set a new Australian All Comers record at 3:54.36, splitting a 56.42 for the butterfly leg of the relay.

2022

As a result of her successful 2021 Olympics campaign, and under a new rule from Swimming Australia, McKeon was pre-selected for the 2022 Commonwealth Games in Birmingham, England without having to take part in the Australian Swimming Championships. Having also chosen to sit out of the 2022 World Aquatics Championships in Budapest, the Commonwealth Games was the first time McKeon raced competitively in 2022. McKeon broke the record for the most Commonwealth Games medals ever received after winning six gold, one silver and one bronze medals, and bringing her total medal count to 20. She also equalled the most gold medals won at a single Games previously set by Susie O'Neill and Ian Thorpe; and her eight medals equals the most medals won at a single Games, a record previously held by Susie O'Neill. As part of the mixed 4 × 100 metre freestyle relay, a new event for the Games, McKeon split a 52.21 in the final leg, securing a gold medal and helping to set a Commonwealth Games record with an overall time of 3:21.18. McKeon anchored the women's 4 × 100 metre freestyle relay final and with a 52.04 split help to win a gold medal with an overall time of 3:30.64. In the 50 metre freestyle, McKeon advanced through to the semifinals after qualifying second in the preliminary heats with a time of 24.52. In the semifinal, she swam a time of 24.51, placing third and making it through to the final, where she won the gold medal in a time of 23.99. McKeon swam a 26.65 in the 50 metre butterfly preliminary heats to qualify fourth for the semifinal where she advanced through in a time of 26.02. In the final, McKeon earned herself a gold medal after finishing first in a time of 25.90. In another new event for the Games, McKeon anchored the mixed 4 × 100 metre medley relay, helping to win a gold medal and setting a Games record with a 51.88 split for her freestyle leg, and an overall time of 3:41.30. In the women's 4 × 100 metre medley relay, McKeon swam a 56.59 split for the butterfly leg and with an overall time of 3:54.44, earned the gold medal. In the 100 metre butterfly, McKeon swam a 57.34 in the preliminary heats to qualify first for the semifinal where she swam a 57.49 and again qualified first for the final. In the final, she finished in second place with a time of 56.38 securing a silver medal. In her final event of the program, McKeon swam a 55.36 in the 100 metre freestyle preliminary heats to advance through to the semifinals after qualifying in sixth position. In the semifinal, she swam a time of 53.1, qualifying first for the final, where she swam a 52.94 to finish in third place, earning a bronze medal.

International Swimming League (ISL) 
McKeon is a member of the London Roar team and she competed in the 2019 inaugural season of the International Swimming League (ISL). The ISL is an annual professional swimming league featuring a team-based competition format with fast paced race sessions. 10 teams featuring the world’s best swimmers compete.

2021 Swimming World Cup

Stops 1—2: Berlin and Budapest
McKeon was the overall highest scoring female competitor at the short course 2021 FINA Swimming World Cup stop in Budapest, Hungary. Among the events she won in Budapest was the 50 metre butterfly in which she finished first with a time of 24.97 seconds. In the 100 metre freestyle, McKeon dropped almost half a second from her time at the first World Cup stop to win the gold medal in a time of 50.58 seconds which tied the World Cup record set by Sarah Sjöström of Sweden in 2017. Prior to stop two in Budapest, at the first stop in Berlin, she swam a personal best time in the 100 metre freestyle with a time of 50.96 seconds and won the gold medal. For the first two World Cup stops, Berlin and Budapest, McKeon was the highest scoring female competitor both at each individual stop and combined across both stops. McKeon's total score for the Budapest stop, 58.3 points, was the highest individual score by any competitor, male or female, for the first two stops of the World Cup circuit, with the only other competitors scoring in the 58 point range being Matthew Sates of South Africa who scored 58.2 points in Berlin, Tom Shields of the United States who scored 58.1 points in Budapest, and Kira Toussaint of the Netherlands who scored 58.1 points in Budapest. McKeon's moment where she tied the World Cup record set by Sarah Sjöström was ranked by FINA as the number five moment from the entire 2021 Swimming World Cup.

Stop 3: Doha

Star status landed McKeon at the top of the list of athletes to watch at the third World Cup stop, held in Doha, Qatar, as named by Swimming World and FINA in advance of the start of competition. Going for building consistency in her four individual events, McKeon entered to compete in the 50 metre freestyle, 100 metre freestyle, 50 metre butterfly, and 100 metre butterfly in Doha. On day one of competition, McKeon swam a 24.09 in the prelims heats of the 50 metre freestyle in the morning, ranking second by a twenty-three hundredths of a seconds after Ranomi Kromowidjojo of the Netherlands and advancing to the final in the evening. Finishing in a time of 23.54 in the final, McKeon won her first medal of the Doha stop, a silver medal. Having won the gold medal in the 50 metre freestyle in Berlin and Budapest, the silver medal was her first non-gold medal finish in the event for the year's World Cup circuit. The next day, October 22, McKeon raced in the timed final of the 50 metre butterfly, finishing in a time of 25.07 seconds and making the podium by winning the bronze medal. The third and final day of competition in Doha, she started off with 51.82 in the prelims of the 100 metre freestyle, ranking first overall and advancing to the final. In the evening finals session, McKeon swam a 55.83 and won the gold medal in her first race of the evening, the 100 metre butterfly. She finished off her events in Doha in the final of the 100 metre freestyle, swimming a 51.15 and finishing first to win the gold medal. When scores were tallied across the first three stops of the World Cup, McKeon retained her overall lead amongst female competitors with her total score of 170.0 points, though Kira Toussaint was not far behind in second-place with a score of 169.2 points.

Stop 4: Kazan

Her entries in sprint events for both freestyle and butterfly at the fourth and final stop of the World Cup circuit, located at the Palace of Water Sports in Kazan, Russia for the year, were noted by FINA as races to watch during competition. McKeon spoke of competition for the last stop, providing context in terms of her history competing in Kazan and performance with a lack of spectators, at a FINA-hosted press conference preceding competition:

In the prelims heats of the 50 metre freestyle on day one of competition, McKeon was the only swimmer under 24 seconds and advanced to the final ranked first with her time of 23.98 seconds. She followed up her strong morning performance with a gold-medal-winning time of 23.53 seconds in the final in the evening, just three hundredths of a second off her personal best time in the event. The morning of day two, McKeon tied for first in the prelims heats of the 50 metre butterfly with a time of 25.50 seconds and advanced to the final. Later in the day, she won the silver medal with a personal best time of 24.94 seconds in the final of the 50 metre butterfly. For the last day of competition of the World Cup circuit, McKeon had a busy morning, she started off by ranking first in the 100 metre butterfly prelims heats with a time of 57.35 seconds, which was about four tenths of a second ahead of second-ranked Maria Ugolkova of Switzerland. In the 100 metre freestyle prelims heats, her second race of the morning, McKeon ranked first again, this time by over a second ahead of second-ranked competitor Madison Wilson of Australia with her time of 51.94 seconds. McKeon won the gold medal in the final of the 100 metre butterfly later in the day, swimming a time of 55.63 seconds. She won her second gold medal of the day in the final of the 100 metre freestyle with a time of 50.67 seconds. Her time of 50.67 seconds registered as the fourth fastest swim in history and made two of the four fastest times in the event hers, she also had the second fastest swim of 50.58 seconds. Speaking of her wins, McKeon told FINA, "I am in pretty in good shape now. The preparations, which I took for the Olympics, still pay off." McKeon's performances across all four stops of the World Cup made her the highest overall scoring competitor of any gender, coming in at 228.3 total points and $144,000 of prize money. The only competitor to score higher than her at a single World Cup stop was male swimmer Daiya Seto of Japan who scored 58.9 points at the Kazan stop. In terms of total medals won by a female competitor, McKeon ranked third with her total of fourteen medals, which included ten gold medals, three silver medals, and one bronze medal, and in terms of similarity of medal count and breakdown with another competitor, male or female, she and Tom Shields of the United States had the exact same medal count and breakdown.

2022 Short Course Championships

Australian Short Course Championships
At the Australian Short Course Swimming Championships held in Sydney, New South Wales in August 2022, McKeon swam a light schedule, competing in just two events. In the 100 metre freestyle, she swam 51.61 in the preliminary heats to qualify first for the final, where she won gold in a time of 51.03. McKeon again qualified first in the 50 metre freestyle preliminary heats with a time of 23.79. In the final, McKeon swam a 23.61 to finish first, earning herself a gold medal.

FINA World Short Course Championships

McKeon was selected as part of a 36-person team for the FINA World Swimming Championships to be held in Melbourne, Victoria in December 2022. McKeon started her campaign swimming a 51.76 split in the women's 4 × 100 metre freestyle relay in the preliminary heats to advance first through to the final. In the final, McKeon anchored the relay splitting a 49.96 and becoming the first woman to swim a sub-50 freestyle short course split. Her efforts earned Australia a gold medal and a new World Short Course record with an overall time of 3:25.43. In the 100 metre freestyle, McKeon advanced through to the semifinals after qualifying third in the preliminary heats with a time of 52.23. In the semifinal, she swam a 51.28 to make it through in first to the final, where she won the gold medal and set a new World Championships record with a time of 50.77. McKeon split a 22.73 in the last leg of the women's 4 × 50 metre freestyle relay final and with an overall time of 1:34.23, earned a silver medal. As part of the mixed 4 × 50 metre freestyle relay, McKeon swam the final leg of the preliminary heats in a time of 22.98 to see Australia qualify second for the final. In the final, McKeon anchored the relay and with a 22.62 split, she not only helped Australia win the silver medal, but she also become the fastest women in history to split a 50-free leg. In the 50 metre freestyle, McKeon swam a 23.93 in the preliminary heats to advance sixth into the semifinals, where she qualified second for the final in a time of 23.51. In the final, McKeon won gold and set a new World Championships record after swimming a time of 23.04. McKeon swam the butterfly leg of the women's 4 × 50 metre medley relay preliminary heat in a split of 23.23, and with an overall time of 1:44.78 qualified first for the final, where she again swam the butterfly leg in a time of 24.43. Her efforts helped Australia win a gold medal and with an overall time of 1:42.35 established a new World Short Course record. As part of the women's 4 × 100 metre medley relay, McKeon split a 53.93 for the butterfly leg and with an overall time of 3:44.92, collected a silver medal.

Results in major championships

Career best times

Long course metres (50 m pool)

Short course metres (25 m pool)

World records

Long course metres

 split 52.91 (3rd leg); with Bronte Campbell (1st leg), Melanie Schlanger (2nd leg), Cate Campbell (4th leg)
 split 53.41 (1st leg); with Brittany Elmslie (2nd leg), Bronte Campbell (3rd leg), Cate Campbell (4th leg)
 split 52.99 (3rd leg); with Shayna Jack (1st leg), Bronte Campbell (2nd leg), Cate Campbell (4th leg)
 split 1:54.90 (4th leg); with Ariarne Titmus (1st leg), Madison Wilson (2nd leg), Brianna Throssell (3rd leg)
 split 51.35 (3rd leg); with Bronte Campbell (1st leg), Meg Harris (2nd leg), Cate Campbell (4th leg)

Short course metres

 split 49.96 (4th leg); with Mollie O'Callaghan (1st leg), Madison Wilson (2nd leg), Meg Harris (3rd leg)
 split 24.43 (butterfly leg); with Mollie O'Callaghan (backstroke leg), Chelsea Hodges (breaststroke leg), Madison Wilson (freestyle leg)

Olympic records

Long course metres

 split 53.41 (1st leg); with Brittany Elmslie (2nd leg), Bronte Campbell (3rd leg), Cate Campbell (4th leg)
 split 51.35 (3rd leg); with Bronte Campbell (1st leg), Meg Harris (2nd leg), Cate Campbell (4th leg)
 split 55.91 for butterfly leg; with Kaylee McKeown (backstroke), Chelsea Hodges (breaststroke), Cate Campbell (freestyle)

Continental and national records

Long course metres

Short course metres

Awards and honours
 Australian Women's Health Sport Awards, One to Watch: 2014
 Member of the Order of Australia (AM) in the 2022 Australia Day Honours for "significant service to swimming as a Gold Medallist at the Tokyo 2020 Olympic Games". McKeon was previously awarded the Medal of the Order of Australia in the 2017 Australia Day Honours for "service to sport as a gold medallist at the Rio 2016 Olympic Games".
 SwimSwam Top 100 (Women's): 2021 (#15), 2022 (#4)
 FINA, Top 10 Moments: 2021 Swimming World Cup (#5)
 FINA, Top 10 Moments: 2020 Summer Olympics (#8 for becoming the Australian athlete to win the most Olympic medals in any sport over the course of their career)
 Swimming World World Swimmer of the Year (female): 2021
 Swimming World Pacific Rim Swimmer of the Year (female): 2021
 FINA, Athlete of the Year, swimming (female): 2021
 SwimSwam Swammy Award, Oceania Swimmer of the Year (female): 2021
 SwimSwam Swammy Award, Swimmer of the Year (female): 2021
 The Australian, Australian of the Year nominee: 2021
 In 2022, McKeon received a nomination for the Laureus World Sports Award for Sportswoman of the Year.
 Swimming Australia, Olympic Program Swimmer of the Year: 2021

Personal life
In July 2022, McKeon confirmed she was dating fellow Australian swimmer, Cody Simpson.

In 2022, at the 'Better future for all' forum held at Griffith University, McKeon suggested that it was "just not fair" to expect cisgender women to compete against transgender women.

See also
 List of Olympic medalists in swimming (women)
 List of multiple Olympic gold medalists
 List of multiple Olympic gold medalists at a single Games
 List of multiple Olympic medalists
 List of multiple Olympic medalists at a single Games
 List of multiple Summer Olympic medalists
 List of top Olympic gold medalists in swimming
 List of World Aquatics Championships medalists in swimming (women)
 List of Commonwealth Games medallists in swimming (women)
 List of Youth Olympic Games gold medalists who won Olympic gold medals
 World record progression 4 × 100 metres freestyle relay
 World and Olympic records set at the 2020 Summer Olympics

References

External links
 
 
 
 
 
 
 
 
 
 
 

1994 births
Living people
Sportspeople from Wollongong
Sportswomen from New South Wales
Australian female butterfly swimmers
Swimmers at the 2014 Commonwealth Games
Swimmers at the 2018 Commonwealth Games
Swimmers at the 2022 Commonwealth Games
Commonwealth Games medallists in swimming
Commonwealth Games gold medallists for Australia
Commonwealth Games silver medallists for Australia
Commonwealth Games bronze medallists for Australia
World Aquatics Championships medalists in swimming
Medalists at the FINA World Swimming Championships (25 m)
Swimmers at the 2010 Summer Youth Olympics
World record holders in swimming
Griffith University alumni
Swimmers at the 2016 Summer Olympics
Swimmers at the 2020 Summer Olympics
Medalists at the 2016 Summer Olympics
Medalists at the 2020 Summer Olympics
Olympic gold medalists for Australia
Olympic silver medalists for Australia
Olympic bronze medalists for Australia
Olympic bronze medalists in swimming
Olympic swimmers of Australia
Olympic gold medalists in swimming
Olympic silver medalists in swimming
Members of the Order of Australia
Australian female freestyle swimmers
Youth Olympic gold medalists for Australia
21st-century Australian women
Medallists at the 2014 Commonwealth Games
Medallists at the 2018 Commonwealth Games
Medallists at the 2022 Commonwealth Games